Otto Polacsek (June 23, 1904 – unknown) was an Austrian speed skater who competed in the 1928 Winter Olympics.

In 1928 he finished eighth in the 5000 metres event and 21st in the 500 metres competition. He also started in the abandoned 10000 metres competition.

External links
 Speed skating 1928 

1904 births
Year of death missing
Austrian male speed skaters
Olympic speed skaters of Austria
Speed skaters at the 1928 Winter Olympics